The Clean Heart is a 1924 American silent drama film directed by J. Stuart Blackton and starring Percy Marmont, Otis Harlan and Marguerite De La Motte.

Cast
 Percy Marmont as Philip Wriford 
 Otis Harlan as Puddlebox 
 Marguerite De La Motte as Essie Bickers 
 Andrew Arbuckle as Bickers 
 Martha Petelle as Mrs. Bickers 
 Violet La Plante as Brida 
 George Ingleton
 Anna Lockhardt

References

Bibliography
 Munden, Kenneth White. The American Film Institute Catalog of Motion Pictures Produced in the United States, Part 1. University of California Press, 1997.

External links

1924 films
1924 drama films
Silent American drama films
American silent feature films
1920s English-language films
Vitagraph Studios films
Films directed by J. Stuart Blackton
Films set in England
Films based on British novels
American black-and-white films
1920s American films